Powel may refer to:
 David Powel (c.1549–1598), Welsh clergyman and historian
 Samuel Powel (1738–1793), American colonial politician
William Garrigues Powel (1852–1894), American politician
 Powel Crosley Jr. (1886–1961), American industrialist
 Powel J. Smith (1874–1942), American businessman and politician

See also
 Powell (disambiguation)

English-language surnames